The Aga (Aga gol) is a river in Zabaykalsky Krai in Russia. It flows into the Onon.

References 

Rivers of Zabaykalsky Krai